Paraclinus walkeri, the San Quintin blenny, is a species of labrisomid blenny native to the coasts of Baja California Sur, Mexico. The specific name honours the fisheries biologist Boyd W. Walker (1917-2001) of the University of California, Los Angeles who placed his specimens at the disposal of Clark Hubbs.

References

walkeri
Fish described in 1952
Taxa named by Clark Hubbs